The 2019 MotoE season (known officially as the 2019 FIM Enel MotoE World Cup for sponsorship reasons) was the inaugural season of the MotoE World Cup for electric motorcycle racing, and was part of the 71st F.I.M. Grand Prix motorcycle racing season. After 6 races between July and November 2019, Italian rider Matteo Ferrari from the Trentino Gresini MotoE team became the first MotoE champion.

Teams and riders
All teams used the Energica Ego Corsa.

Calendar
The following Grands Prix took place during the season:

Jerez paddock fire
In March, all MotoE teams tested the new motorcycles at the Circuito de Jerez but the newly built facility which housed the machines was destroyed by a fire which started around 12:15 a.m. of 14 March. Organizer Dorna Sports announced an investigation into the accident where no-one was injured. The remainder of the scheduled tests were cancelled. A new pre-season test session took place in June and the start of the season was pushed back to the German GP, with the missed starting rounds at Jerez and Le Mans replaced by a doubleheader at the season finale in Valencia.

Results and standings

Grands Prix

Cup standings
Scoring system
Points were awarded to the top fifteen finishers. A rider had to finish the race to earn points.

References

MotoE
Grand Prix motorcycle racing seasons